, provisional designation , is a trans-Neptunian object, approximately 110 kilometers in diameter. The object is trapped in a 1:1 mean motion resonance with Neptune, and rotates nearly every 9 hours around its axis. It was discovered on May 18, 2010 at 7:45 UT by the WISE spacecraft. The WISE telescope scanned the entire sky in infrared light from January 2010 to February 2011.

This object follows a very eccentric orbit (eccentricity of 0.57) with a semi-major axis of 29.97 AU and an inclination of 19.76º. Its aphelion goes into the trans-neptunian belt but its perihelion is relatively close to Saturn's orbit.  follows a complicated and short-lived horseshoe orbit around Neptune. Classical horseshoe orbits include the Lagrangian points L3, L4 and L5, this object horseshoe path goes from the L4 point towards Neptune reaching the L5 point and back. It will become a quasi-satellite of Neptune in about 5,000 years.

 is a rather large minor body with an absolute magnitude of 7.7 that translates into a diameter close to 100 kilometers. The discovering WISE/NEOWISE mission estimates a diameter of  kilometers with a large error margin of 30.820 km.

References

External links
 2010 KR59, Scotti, J. V., During, D. T., Nshimiyimana, M., Tholen, D. J., Grauer, A. D., Ahern, J. D., Beshore, E. C., Boattini, A., Garradd, G. J., Gibbs, A. R., Hill, R. E., Kowalski, R. A., Larson, S. M., McNaught, R. H., Ryan, W. H., Holmes, R., Foglia, S., Mainzer, A., Wright, E., Bauer, J., Grav, T., Dailey, J., Masiero, J., Cutri, R., McMillan, R., & Walker, R.  2010, Minor Planet Electronic Circular, 2010-K66
Four temporary Neptune co-orbitals: (148975) 2001 XA255, (310071) 2010 KR59, (316179) 2010 EN65, and 2012 GX17 de la Fuente Marcos, C., & de la Fuente Marcos, R. 2012, Astronomy and Astrophysics, Volume 547, id.L2, 7 pp.
 IAU list of centaurs and scattered-disk objects
 IAU list of trans-neptunian objects
 Another list of TNOs
 

310071
310071
310071
20100518